The Yaroslav Mudryi National Library of Ukraine (translit.: Yaroslav Mudryi National Library of Ukraine) is one of the national libraries of Ukraine, one of the largest libraries of the country. It was opened in 1866 as the city's public library. The main building of the library is located on 1, Mykhaila Hrushevskoho Street on the European Square in the center of Kyiv. It is the central library of Ukraine's public library system and is a research institute bibliography and library science.

History
The library's building itself was built in 1911, by the architects Z. Kliave and A. Krivosheyev. The library itself was first founded in 1866. During the library's 140 years of existence, it has obtained over 4 million items in its collection (which started out as a private collection). During its existence, it has collated a large collection of early prints, and rare and valuable books.

During the Second World War, the library suffered serious damage and more than 50,000 publications were taken out from its stock. The library building was set on fire by retreating Nazi troops in November 1943, and during only one night of burning, the library lost more than 300,000 editions including 7,000 manuscripts, rare books and pre-revolutionary periodicals.

Since 1944, the library collection was rebuilt anew.

References

External links
  Yaroslav Mudryi National Library of Ukraine Web Site - information about the library

Legislative libraries
Libraries in Kyiv
Library buildings completed in 1911
Verkhovna Rada
1911 establishments in Ukraine
Pecherskyi District
Hrushevsky Street (Kyiv)
National libraries in Ukraine
1866 establishments in the Russian Empire